BCTV may refer to:
 Beet curly top virus, a pathogen of a variety of garden plants
 Berks Community Television in Berks County, Pennsylvania
 Boston Catholic Television, now CatholicTV
 Boston College Television at Boston College
 BCTV or British Columbia Television, now CHAN-DT
 Business Channel Television, now Kompas TV Jawa Timur